The Avon Dam is a heritage-listed dam in Avon, Wingecarribee Shire, New South Wales, Australia. It is one of four dams and weirs in the catchment of the Upper Nepean Scheme, providing water to the Macarthur and Illawarra regions, the Wollondilly Shire, and metropolitan Sydney. The arch dam across the Avon River was completed in 1927 under the supervision of Ernest Macartney de Burgh, the dam is currently managed by the Sydney Catchment Authority and is listed on the New South Wales State Heritage Register.

History
The Upper Nepean Scheme was commenced in 1880 after it was realised that the Botany Swamps scheme was insufficient to meet Sydney's water supply needs. The Nepean project consisted of the construction of a weir across the Nepean River to divert the rivers Cataract, Cordeaux, Avon and Nepean, to the Prospect Reservoir.

By 1902 the original Nepean scheme was found also to be inadequate, after a severe drought had again depleted the water supply. A Royal Commission was appointed in 1902 to report on the water supply situation and in that same year, it recommended the construction of the Cataract Dam, to impound the waters of the Cataract River at a site upstream of Broughton's Pass. Construction of the dam was completed about the end of 1907.

From 1907, rainfall on the catchment area was very low and it was not until January 1911 that Cataract Dam first filled to capacity. This, together with the greatly increased rate of consumption of water, stressed the need for additional water storage.

The Nepean River watershed, from a topographical standpoint, was found to be very favourable for the construction of large water storage works at moderate cost. Rivers such as the Cordeaux, Avon and Nepean, located in narrow gorges, provided very suitable dam sites, with solid rock foundations at a shallow depth. Sandstone could easily be quarried into rough rectangular blocks and used for the construction. These features led to the recommendation that more dams be built.

A site for a second storage dam, Cordeaux, to be built on the Cordeaux River, was selected by the Water Board in the latter part of the 1911 and a gauging weir was constructed. Preliminary plans and estimates were prepared and the foundations tested. Following this, further investigations were carried out by the Public Works Department.

Good rainfall occurred throughout the succeeding years (except for a dry period in 1915–1916) and, because of this and the intervention of World War I, construction on the Cordeaux Dam was not commenced until 1918. In November of that year a Special Board of Experts consisting of engineers from the Public Authorities was appointed by the Government to draw up recommendations for the amplification of the Sydney water supply. This body not only endorsed the construction of the Cordeaux Dam but recommended the construction of the Avon and Nepean Dams as well.

In 1921, three years after the Cordeaux Dam was commenced and five years before it was completed, the Public Works Department commenced work on a third and much higher dam at a site selected on the Avon River, a tributary of the upper Nepean. The Avon Dam was also designed and constructed by the Public Works engineers under the direction of the Chief Engineer for Water Supply and Sewerage, E.M. De Burgh. The resident engineer, during its construction, was Gerald Haskins.

As with the previous dams, Cataract and Cordeaux, Avon Dam was built using cyclopean masonry. This consisted of sandstone blocks, quarried from the site, which were fitted into an irregular pattern and packed with sandstone concrete. However, in this case the rock was quarried to make a deep cut through a ridge to a neighbouring creek to provide the spillway for the dam. Like its predecessors, Avon also had the upstream face of the dam sheathed with a layer of basaltic concrete (2 feet thick) for watertightness and to resist wave and other erosion forces.

The concrete was all manufactured on the site in special metal-crushing, concrete mixing plants. These included Jacques roll-jaw crushers, pulverising mills and Mullimix drum-type batchmixers. From the mixers, the concrete was discharged into concrete skips especially designed to facilitate the distribution of the concrete on the dam wall. All the plant was electrically operated and the current obtained from the State Power Station at Port Kembla by transmission lines  in length.

A road  in length was constructed from Bargo railway station to transport all the materials. Other plant used on the site included two Lidgerwood cableways, three locomotive cranes and four stiff-leg type derrick cranes. All of these were designed and constructed in Australia.

Any hardwood timber of commercial value was cut into sleepers, fencing posts and rails and used in the construction of the works railway to the Nepean Dam then under construction. An extensive area of Coachwood timber (Ceratopetalum apetalum) was found in the storage basin. This was cut at a special sawmill erected at the Dam and a fleet of punts and launches transported the logs down the river to the mill. About 1 million superficial feet (3,540 m3) of sawn and dressed timber was produced. It was used in the construction of buildings in the Nepean Dam township, for wall forms for both the Avon and Nepean Dams and the remainder was sold.

Accommodation for workmen was provided near the construction site in a single-storey barracks for single men. Land was placed at the disposal of the married men who were assisted in constructing temporary houses for themselves and their families.

Avon Dam was completed in 1927 and handed over to the Water Board on 20 January 1928. It was built at the cost of AU£1,047,000.

The Dam served the Sydney area until the completion of Warragamba Dam in 1960, after which, in 1963, its storage was reserved to meet the increased water supply needs of the Wollongong area. An electrical pumping station located in Flying Fox Creek, at the end of the stored water remote from the wall, pumps water over the Divide to Wollongong and Port Kembla.

In 1973, as part of a plan to interconnect the various water supply systems for Sydney, Wollongong and Sutherland, a tunnel was constructed between the Nepean Dam and the Avon Dam. This allows water to be transferred in either direction, as required.

Description 
The Avon Dam was the third and largest of the four dams constructed to develop the Upper Nepean catchment area, in order to meet Sydney's ever increasing demand for water. It was built using cyclopean masonry. This consisted of sandstone blocks, quarried from the site, which were fitted into an irregular pattern and packed with sandstone concrete. However, in this case the rock was quarried to make a deep cut through a ridge to a neighbouring creek to provide the spillway for the dam. Like its predecessors, Avon also had the upstream face of the dam sheathed with a layer of basaltic concrete (2 feet thick) for watertightness and to resist wave and other erosion forces.

Each end of the dam wall is flanked by massive Egyptian style pylons complete with decorative lotus columns. It is fitted with outlet valves on two levels. The lower draw-offs, which were used for passing the stream flow during construction work, consist of two  diameter pipes fitted with  diameter needle valves at the level of the river bed.

Specifications for Avon Dam:
 Capacity: 47,153 million gallons (214,500 megalitres) (now 146,700 megalitres)..
 Greatest depth of water: .
 Greatest height of wall above foundations: .
 Area of lake at full supply level: .
 Cost: £1,047,000.
 Concrete in wall: 219,515 cubic yards (167,929 cu metres).
 Length at crest including pylons: .
 Length at spillway weir: .
 Width at base: .
 Width at crest: .
 Area of lake catchment: 55 sq miles (142km2).

The Dam today has a well-developed picnic area on its eastern side, approximately in the area formerly occupied by the construction village. This picnic area features landscaped gardens within picturesque retaining walls, large areas of lawn and modern amenities and shelter facilities. There is a large rivetted steel (possibly cast-iron) elevated water tank within the picnic area, carried on rivetted plate-web girders and cast steel (or iron) posts. There is only one early residential building remaining, believed to be the former Resident Engineers residence. It is a single-storey weatherboard building with terracotta tiled hipped roof which also has a breakfront gabled wing. It is simply detailed with carved timber brackets to a projecting rectangular window frame and roughcast render to the chimney. One other house dates from the 1960s and two from the 1970s/80s and are all single-storey brick cottages. The earlier cottage is of red brick and has terracotta tiles to a hipped and gabled roof. The two later cottages appear to have been built to the same design and feature concrete tiled, gable roofs and utilise large-dimension mottled bricks. The works office and the picnic area amenities buildings are single storey brick buildings, recent in origin, with either profiled steel skillion roofs or gable roofs clad in concrete tiles.

After the immediate dam environment of the Cataract Dam, that of the Avon Dam is perhaps the most scenically impressive landscape. Near the dam wall there are several distinct gardens that function as individual picnic areas. These include a series of grotto-like shelters along the sandstone cliff that defines the western edge of the area; a discrete palm-planted area with ornamental pools; and a larger park-like area extending to the south along the edge of the dam.

The cliffline landscape includes shelters with stone and cement-rendered seating, some cement faux rockwork walling, plantings of Wisteria, palms, Cordyline sp., Cyathea sp. and various ferns. The pool garden is dominated by four large circular ponds, with small intermediate ponds, made from rendered cement. The larger ponds even have their own planters attached to the sides. The ponds are surrounded by an array of palm and Cordyline plantings in order to engender the ambience of an Egyptian oasis.

Nearby, the main gardens are contained within the elongated park-like area to the south. The entry features a pair of stone piers incorporating the words AVON DAM in quartz pebbles and a central path that leads to various picnic tables. There are plantings of Swamp Cypress (Taxodium distichum), Hoop Pine (Araucaria cunninghamii), Syzygium, Podocarpus, Acer, Camellia, Flowering Cherry and Liquidambar. Other features include rustic picnic structures, birdbath, [Chinese] lantern and propagating structure. On the ridge above these gardens are several interwar cottages with contemporary plantings of Monterey Pinus (Pinus radiata), Cypress, Crepe Myrtle, Viburnum and Photinia. To the northeast of the cottages are the remains of a propagating structure - further testifying to the importance attached to the establishment and maintenance of this landscape. Nearby is a very large Scribbly Gum which, as part of the indigenous vegetation, long predates any use of the site for Sydney's water supply. The loop road, giving access to the area along the ridge, is edged by a low stone retaining wall that also dates to the late 1920s-1930s period. Along the main entry road to the dam site near an old gate are clumps of Agave americana and Flax which may indicate the earlier presence of a cottage now demolished.

Heritage listing 
The Avon Dam was the third and the largest of the four water supply dams built as part of the development of the Upper Nepean Water Supply Scheme, one of the most important engineering works and items of public infrastructure in Australia, and is still the second largest of all the NSW water supply dams in terms of storage capacity. It was designed by the NSW Public Works Department under the direction of one of Australia's leading water supply engineers, E.M. De Burgh. The completion of the Avon Dam was a significant step in the continuing process of providing a reliable water supply for Sydney and surrounding areas as part of the Upper Nepean Scheme. Even by the international standards of the time, Avon was a high dam with a large impoundment of water and was a significant work of engineering in its day. It continues to play an important role as the major source of supply for the Wollongong, Port Kembla and surrounding towns and areas.

Additionally, the Avon Dam is a handsome, well proportioned structure with strong Egyptian style architectural character which complements the monumental nature of the structure and its attractive natural surroundings.

The roadway was constructed prior to the Dam between 1918 and 1921, and was used to transport all materials, stores and labour and significantly provided the sole route of transportation, other dam sites relying on a combination of road, tram or ropeway, and continues to be used as the main access to the present time.

The Avon Dam includes a range of ancillary structures which form components of the overall site. One building is believed to be the original Residential Engineers residence and is a fine example of an Interwar Bungalow. The other residential buildings associated with the dam are relatively modern replacements for the original set of houses, but are representative of their type.

The grounds associated with the Avon Dam are of considerable aesthetic and social value.
They contain an important, substantially intact interwar landscape design - including ornamental ponds, grottoes and rustic picnic structures - particularly incorporating various Egyptian Revival references to complement the thematic treatment of the architecture associated with the main dam structures. The immediate dam area is of distinction as a scenic landscape.

Avon Dam was listed on the New South Wales State Heritage Register on 18 November 1999 having satisfied the following criteria.

The place is important in demonstrating the course, or pattern, of cultural or natural history in New South Wales.

Avon Dam is constructed within the Upper Nepean Catchment Area which was developed with the completion of the Cataract and Nepean tunnels in 1888 as the fourth source of water supply for Sydney. The potential of the Upper Nepean Catchment Area to supply water was fully developed through the construction of four major dams between 1903 and 1936. Avon Dam is the third of these dams to have been completed. The Upper Nepean Catchment Area continues to supply the regions of Sydney and the Illawarra, with Avon Dam providing a supply to the Illawarra region through the Upper Avon water pumping station.

Avon Dam was the fifth of the major water supply/irrigation dams constructed in NSW during the first half of the twentieth century. The design and technologies used in the construction of the dam are representative of methods developed by the Public Works Department of NSW at the time.

In conjunction with the completion of Cordeaux Dam in 1926, the impounded water of the Avon Catchment Area provided one of the major sources of water for domestic and industrial consumption in metropolitan Sydney, the largest city in NSW. In providing water for metropolitan Sydney during this era the dam, in ensuring security of supply, contributed to the extensive residential, commercial and industrial development of Sydney during the 1920s and 1930s.

The place has a strong or special association with a person, or group of persons, of importance of cultural or natural history of New South Wales's history.

The design and construction of Avon Dam was undertaken by the Water Supply and Sewerage Branch of the NSW Public Works Department. The construction of the dam drew upon the knowledge and experience of a number of the engineers employed in the Branch at the time including Ernest M. De Burgh (engineer in chief), the successful completion of the dam and its continuation of use as a water supply dam are a lasting testament to the professional capabilities of the Federation/Inter War era generation of engineers of the Public Works Department.

The former official quarters at Avon Dam, has provided for a number of generations, a holiday type residence for the board members of the Water Board. The buildings and grounds have some associations with past identities of the board, which was until comparatively recently one of the major government departments in NSW in regard to its economic and political influence.

The tract of West Australian gum trees situated to the north west of the former official quarters was planted out by board members of the Water Board in 1928. The trees have particular memorial associations with past identities of the Board.

The place is important in demonstrating aesthetic characteristics and/or a high degree of creative or technical achievement in New South Wales.

The wall of Avon Dam is an engineering work imbued with a sense of high aesthetic value expressed through the long curved wall set within the steep valley of the Avon River.

The design and finishes of the crest house, entry pylons and lower valve house in the Inter War Egyptian style were undertaken by the Government Architects Branch of the Public Works Department at that time headed by George McCrae. The architectural detailing of the superstructures evokes a romanticised vision of the "Ancient Near East" at a time when many Australians had first hand experience of the area through military service, and through knowledge of archaeological finds reported in the popular press.

The dam is set within the valley of the Avon River. Upstream of the dam wall this setting is characterised by the broad expanse of the pool of water bordered by the crests of the valley sides. Downstream of the dam wall the setting is characterised by the steeper inclines that graduate into the river gorge. The topography, at times of high water level, imparts a picturesque scene when viewed from selective vantage points above and on the dam wall.

The former resident officer's cottage erected at the time of construction is an excellent, albeit much modified, example of the high standard of accommodation provided for resident Public Works Department for its senior staff.
The landscaping of its lower picnic grounds exhibit a high level of design awareness through its planning, evolution and association with the Botanic Gardens on the original layout and selection of species.

The place has a strong or special association with a particular community or cultural group in New South Wales for social, cultural or spiritual reasons.

The dam and grounds are recognised by the National Trust of Australia (NSW) as being a place which is part of the cultural environment of Australia which has aesthetic, historical, architectural, archeological, scientific and social significance for future generations, as well as for the present community of NSW.

The dam and grounds are recognised by the Heritage Council of NSW as a place which is of significance to NSW in relation to its historical, scientific, cultural, social, archeological, natural and aesthetic values.

The place has potential to yield information that will contribute to an understanding of the cultural or natural history of New South Wales.

The cyclopean masonry of the dam is an excellent and early example of gravity dam construction in the Inter War era incorporating inspection galleries, contraction, joints and foundation drainage system which collectively demonstrate the principal characteristics of the state development of this technology at the time.
The double level discharge, penstock gates and roller gates collectively demonstrate the principal characteristics of the state development of this technology at the time.

The terraces and platforms adjoining the dam abutments demarcate the location of plant and equipment used to in the construction of the dam, in particular the location of the cableway head towers, the quarry railway terrace, the motor vehicle garage, and the electricity substation.

The grounds of the dam retain numerous tree plantings undertaken from the time of the completion of the dam in 1928. Collectively the diversity of these trees present a good record of past horticultural practices.

The catchment area in being relatively untouched bushland in close proximity to a major urban area has a high potential for further research into natural ecosystems.

The place possesses uncommon, rare or endangered aspects of the cultural or natural history of New South Wales.

The basin of the reservoir of Avon Dam is the area of the largest impoundment within the Upper Nepean Catchment Area.

Avon Dam is one of three dams in NSW which incorporate extensive Inter War Egyptian Architectural detailing. Avon Dam is however unique in always retaining remnant landscape features that continues to evoke the imagery of an Egyptian revival landscape.

Avon Dam is one of two dams in NSW which incorporate pedestrian and vehicular entry pavilions to the crest wall.

The crest and valve houses and inlet works retain original ironwork and machinery such as the roller gates and penstock gates and operating mechanism which represent a substantial repository of water supply delivery technology of the era.
The spillway channel was the largest in terms of the depth and width constructed up to that date within the Sydney metropolitan area.

The purpose-built road of access to the dam wall from the railhead at Bargo is unique within the context of the four metropolitan Dams in being the principal means by which the general supplies, men and raw materials were transported during the construction process.

The dam wall retains evidence for a scour outlet operating system which was unique to Avon Dam.

The dam incorporates cyclopean masonry which is a construction technique unique to the Metropolitan Dams in Australia.

The place is important in demonstrating the principal characteristics of a class of cultural or natural places/environments in New South Wales.

Avon Dam is representative of a type of dam (cyclopean masonry gravity dam) constructed in NSW by the Water Supply and sewerage Branch of the Public Works department during the first half of the twentieth century. Key representative attributes of the dam's design and construction include the use of cyclopean masonry bedded in sandstone concrete, use of blue metal concrete in facing the upstream face, use of sandstone concrete in the facing of the downstream face, use of a spillway set away from the gravity wall, lower valve/crest house attractively designed and finished to a high standard, the use of an array of upstream intakes to regulate the quality of water supply, the internal inspection galleries, the foundation drainage system, the contraction joints, and the internal drainage system.

The upgrading works to the spillway and dam wall with the compacted rock embankment and spill weir redesign, competed in 1971 to make the dam meet modern safety requirements, are representative of engineering practice of the day.

The upgrading of the valves within the dam wall and ancillary monitoring and operating equipment is representative of modern dam safe operating practice.

The construction technologies used at Avon Dam are representative of dams constructed in NSW through the first half of the twentieth century by the Public Works Department. Key representative attributes of the dam's construction techniques include the use of cableways, the building of temporary camps to house labourers and tradesmen, building of permanent cottages to house salaried staff, the construction of terrace platforms to house plant and machinery, mechanisation of concrete production, the construction of a purpose-built road of access to transport men, supplies and materials from the nearest railhead to the construction sites, the building of permanent infrastructure such as water supply for plant and men and houses, the use of electricity to power plant and equipment.

The rehabilitation of tracts of scarred in the construction process employed at Avon Dam through beautification works is representative of practices undertaken at other dams throughout NSW. Key representative attributes of this practice include utilising the former camp as a picnic area, utilising the former terraced construction platforms as picnic areas and lookouts, and utilising the former construction roads for vehicular access to the dam site ands dam wall.

The practice of ongoing maintenance of the wall after completion through resident staff and workshop facilities is representative of procedures undertaken at other dams and weirs constructed in NSW.

See also

List of reservoirs and dams in New South Wales
Sydney Water
Shoalhaven Scheme
Upper Canal System

References

Bibliography

Attribution

Further reading

 
 WaterNSW - 

Dams in New South Wales
Dams completed in 1927
Southern Highlands (New South Wales)
Arch dams
Concrete-face rock-fill dams
New South Wales State Heritage Register
Sydney Water
Articles incorporating text from the New South Wales State Heritage Register
Upper Nepean Scheme
1927 establishments in Australia
Wingecarribee Shire